HD 28454, also known as HR 1418, is a solitary, yellowish-white hued star located in the southern constellation Caelum, the chisel. It has an apparent magnitude of 6.1, making it faintly visible to the naked eye under ideal conditions.

HD 28454 is an ordinary F-type main sequence star with a stellar classification of F5.5 V. It has 1.21 times the mass of the Sun and 1.42 times its radius. The star is metal deficient, having an iron abundance 56% that of the Sun's.

References

F-type main-sequence stars
Caelum
028454
020781
1418
Durchmusterung objects
Caeli, 3